La sembradora is a Mexican telenovela produced by Valentín Pimstein for Telesistema Mexicano in 1965.

Cast 
 Maricruz Olivier as Mercedes
 Rafael Llamas as Horacio
 Carlos Navarro as Eugenio
 Graciela Doring as Inés
 Patricia Morán as Amanda
 Fedora Capdevilla as Matilde
 Fernando Mendoza as Juan
 Alicia Montoya as Petra
 Gloria Estrada as Dueña de la pensión
 Alberto Galán as José
 Tara Parra as Amapola "Ama"
 Ismael Valle as Faustini

References

External links 

Mexican telenovelas
1965 telenovelas
Televisa telenovelas
Spanish-language telenovelas
1965 Mexican television series debuts
1965 Mexican television series endings